Shashwat Dham is a Hindu religious site and tourist destination situated on East West Highway in Devchuli, Nawalpur district. The dham (religious site) consists of a temple of lord Shiva and a Vedic karmakanda gurukul. It has Sri Sri Center for Yoga and Meditation. It was constructed by the CG Group. The temple is spread over 12 acres of land.

Architecture 
The main temple is dedicated to Lord Shiva and is known as Ekambareshwor. It is modeled in Khajurao-style of architecture. The temple is surrounded by pond filled with water of various holy shrines from the Indian subcontinent such as Badrinath, Kedarnath, Muktinath and Pashupatinath.

Inauguration
The dham was inaugurated by President Bidya Devi Bhandari on March 7, 2017. Kamal Thapa, Bikram Pandey , Indian religious leader Sri Sri Ravi Shankar and Sri Lankan Minister Dayaa Gamagae were also present at the programme.

See also 

 Bhaleshwor Mahadev
 Triveni Dham
 Maula Kalika Temple

References
Hindu temples in Gandaki Province
Buildings and structures in Nawalpur District
2017 establishments in Nepal